Khairul Anwar bin Shahrudin (born 9 October 1990) is a Malaysian footballer who plays as midfielder for Melaka United. 

Born in Bentong, Pahang, Khairul Anwar began his football career playing for MP Muar U21 team in 2012 at the age of 21, before been promoted to the senior team. In 2014, Khairul Anwar playing for DRB-Hicom and then playing for Sime Darby in 2015.

References

Living people
1990 births
DRB-Hicom F.C. players
Negeri Sembilan FA players
Sime Darby F.C. players
Terengganu FC players
Melaka United F.C. players
Malaysia Super League players
Malaysian footballers
People from Pahang
Association football midfielders